16 Biggest Hits is the fifth greatest hits compilation album by American country music artist Alan Jackson. It is part of a series of similar 16 Biggest Hits albums released by Legacy Recordings. It has sold 446,000 copies in the United States as of May 2013.

Track listing

Chart performance
16 Biggest Hits peaked at #22 on the U.S. Billboard Top Country Albums chart the week of August 25, 2007. It also peaked at #141 on the Billboard 200 the week of March 22, 2008.

Weekly charts

Year-end charts

References

Jackson, Alan
Alan Jackson compilation albums
2007 greatest hits albums
Arista Records compilation albums